The Njuup tradition is a Serer style of music rooted in the Ndut initiation rite, which is a rite of passage that young Serers must go through once in their lifetime as commanded in the Serer religion.

History
Njuup songs are religious in nature. For a large part of its history, Njuup was only used within the Ndut ritual. The history of Njuup comes from the older Ndut style of teachings. Young Serer boys in the ndut (nest) were required to create religious tunes during their rite of passage to take their minds off the transitional experience, build their aesthetic skills, and enhance their spirituality. The veneration of Serer Pangool influenced the songs of the Ndut, including Njuup.

Modern Senegambian artists who sing the purest form of Njuup in the Serer language include Rémi Jegaan Dioh and Yandé Codou Sène.

Influence

Njuup is the progenitor of Mbalax music. Mbalax music originated when prominent Senegalese artists, such Youssou N'Dour, began to incorporate Njuup into their works Unlike Njuup, which is religious, Mbalax is party music. All Mbalax artists are strongly influenced by the Njuup tradition. Senegalese artists who specialize in Mbalax include Mbaye Dieye Faye, Youssou N'Dour, and Thione Seck.

See also
Mbalax
Music of Senegal
Junjung
Talking drum
Sabar
Timeline of Serer history
Serer ancient history

References

Further reading
Dione, Salif, "L’appel du Ndut ou l’initiation des garçons seereer", Dakar, Institut Fondamental d'Afrique Noire / Enda-Editions(2004) 
Gravrand, Henry, "La civilisation sereer : Pangool", vol.2, Les Nouvelles Editions Africaines du Sénégal, (1990), 
Faye, Louis Diène, "Mort et Naissance Le Monde Sereer", Les Nouvelles Edition Africaines (1983), 

Serer culture
Serer religion
Senegalese music
Gambian music
Religious music
Ancient music